Amphitryon is a character of Greek mythology.

Amphitryon may also refer to:
Amphitryon (film), a 1935 German musical film
Amphitryon (Plautus play), a Latin play by Plautus from ca. 190–185 B.C.
Amphitryon (Molière play), a French comedy after Plautus from 1668
Amphitryon (Dryden play), a 1691 English comedy after Plautus and Molière
Amphitryon (Kleist), a German play after Molière and Plautus from 1807
Amphitryon 38, a 1929 play by Jean Giraudoux